The PDP-8/e was a model of the PDP-8 line of minicomputers, designed by the Digital Equipment Corporation to be a general purpose computer that inexpensively met the needs of the average user while also being capable of modular expansion to meet the more specific needs of advanced user.

Description
The first prototype was built in 1970, and was among the first minicomputers small enough to fit in the back seat of a Volkswagen Beetle Convertible. It originally sold for $6,500 but after 18 months the price was dropped to $4995 to make it the only computer under $5000 available at that time. 

The standard -8/e included a processor, core memory, a data terminal, a tape control and drive, a programmers table, a line printer, software operating system and when purchased included installation, training and maintenance as part of the purchase agreement.

The PDP-8/e featured a processor with single-address fixed word length, parallel transfer computer using 12-bit, two's complement arithmetic. The 1.2/1.4 microsecond cycle time provides a computation rate of 385,000 additions per second.  It was built to be versatile and has a high capacity input/output that supports more than 60 types of peripherals. It could be used for a variety of tasks, from keeping score at Fenway Park to monitoring stimuli to the brain during brain surgery at Massachusetts General Hospital.

Basic system
The basic PDP-8/E system was a 10.5 x 19 x 24 inch
 
(6 rack unit) rackmount or table top unit that contained the processor, core memory, front panel controls ("programmer's console"), console terminal interface for use with an external data terminal, and 115 or 230 volt AC power supply.

Peripherals

Processor options
 Extended Arithmetic Element - Enables the performance of complex arithmetic at high speeds
 FPP-12 Floating Point Processor - Provides a dual-processor capability for faster calculations
 Power Fail and Automatic Restart - Restores operation automatically after a power failure and protects the operating program
 Real-Time Clocks - Programmable, line frequency, or crystal controlled intervals
 MI8-E hardware bootstrap, an array of diodes allowing startup without manually toggling in the bootstrap via the front panel

Mass storage devices
 DECtape magnetic tape drives
 RX01 8 inch floppy disk drives (256kB)
 RK05 hard drive with removable cartridge (2.5 Mb). Left rack in photo
 Paper Tape Readers and Punches - Punches up to 50 characters a second, reads up to 300 characters per second
 Card Readers - Marked or punched cards read at 300 cards per minute

Display devices
 Video and Writing Tablets - Alphanumeric and graphic display point-plot displays; light pens; telephone line transmission
 Hard-Copy Devices - incremental plotters; line printers with 64- or 96-characters sets, 165 characters per second or 356 lines per minute

Data communications devices
 Synchronous Communications - Modem interface for Bell 201- and 300-series modems or equivalent
 Asynchronous Communications - Serial-line interface at various send/receive Baud rates; single or double buffered interfaces\
 Automatic Calling Units - 10-Channel multiplexer

Laboratory devices
 Analog to Digital Converters
 Digital to Analog Converters
 Programmable Real-Time Clock
 Digital I/O
 Heathkit EU-801E Laboratory I/O buffered interface, provided a 12-bit wide data port to the PDP-8. Used by David Larsen (Virginia Tech) in his course to instruct researchers in interfacing minicomputers

Terminals
 CRT and Data-Entry Terminals - Alphanumeric 16-character keyboards; standard telephone line transmission
 Teletype Terminals - send and receive only; synchronous read and punch
 Hard-Copy Terminals - Serial or parallel interfaces

References

External links 
  Information on the PDP-8 Family from Old-computers.com
 PDFs and Technical information
  University of Iowa PDP information

DEC minicomputers